Justice Society: World War II is an American animated superhero film produced by Warner Bros. Animation and DC Entertainment. It is the 41st film of the DC Universe Animated Original Movies and the second installment of the Tomorrowverse. The film is directed by Jeff Wamester and starring the voices of Stana Katic, Matt Bomer, Elysia Rotaru, Chris Diamantopoulos, Omid Abtahi, Matthew Mercer, Armen Taylor, and Liam McIntyre. It tells an original story of the Flash ending up back in time to World War II where he meets the Justice Society of America and helps them thwart the threat of the Nazis and the Advisor.

Plot
During World War II, with Nazi Germany invading most of Europe and Adolf Hitler seeking magical artifacts, President Franklin D. Roosevelt is asked by Colonel Steve Trevor to get the United States involved by creating a team of superhumans. Consisting of Trevor, Black Canary, Hawkman, Hourman, Jay Garrick / Flash, and led by Wonder Woman, the Justice Society of America is formed.

In the present, Barry Allen and Iris West picnic in Metropolis, hoping to get away from "work". However, their plans are disrupted by Superman fighting Brainiac. Allen comes to Superman's aid as the Flash. When Brainiac fires a Kryptonite bullet, Flash tries to catch it, but he runs fast enough to channel the Speed Force for the first time. Guided by Doctor Fate's voice, Allen arrives in what he believes is the past during a battle between the JSA and the Nazis. Despite initial confusion over his allegiance, the JSA realizes Allen is an ally after he defeats the Nazis and saves Trevor and that he is seemingly from the future. As the team mobilizes to stop a second wave of Nazis, Allen takes Trevor back to the JSA's base, where he learns about the team, whom he never heard of before.

After meeting "Shakespeare", the JSA's war correspondent, and Trevor attempts to propose to Wonder Woman, the JSA meet for their next mission. Despite the risk of causing a time paradox, the heroes realize they need Allen's help in saving a codebreaker from a Nazi fortress who can decode a message Trevor stole.

Arriving at the fortress, the heroes and "Shakespeare" break in, defeat the guards, and discover several prisoners in the dungeons. "Shakespeare" rescues a prisoner who says someone told him of his arrival, and implores him to prevent something from happening. A guard attacks "Shakespeare", only for the bullets to bounce off of him. When Wonder Woman, Allen, and Trevor arrive, "Shakespeare" identifies himself as Clark Kent. However, when he reveals a different background from the Kent he knows, Allen realizes that he is actually in a parallel reality. The rest of the team finds the codebreaker, whom Hawkman recognizes as Doctor Fate. Breaking the code with his powers, Fate directs the team to the Bermuda Triangle before disappearing.

Arriving at the Triangle by sub, the team is detected by Nazi warships. After depth charges disable the engines, the Flashes jump-start the sub while Wonder Woman heads out to destroy the enemy ships. The heroes are saved by Atlantean soldiers, who direct them to a nearby outpost. Met by the Advisor, the team meets Aquaman, who imprisons them. It is revealed that the code was a Nazi trap and Aquaman is being controlled by the Advisor, who is influencing the Atlanteans to work with the Nazis in the hopes of destroying them later so he can take over the planet. After the Flashes realize they are becoming weaker while they are together, they join forces to regain their strength and break out. The team splits up, with one heading for New York to stop the Nazis and Atlanteans while Allen and Wonder Woman try to stop Aquaman and the Advisor from releasing monsters from the Trench.

As Atlantean forces attack Manhattan, they are confronted by the JSA. The heroes gain the upper hand until the Trench monsters arrive, killing Hawkman and wounding Hourman. Garrick and Canary destroy the monsters while Wonder Woman and Allen arrive and fight Aquaman, during the long heated battle with the help of Trevor she was able to break Aquaman's trident and frees him from the Advisor's control. Realizing what he has done, Aquaman retreats in guilt, but the Advisor reappears and reveals that a follow-up strike by Nazi bombers is imminent before killing Trevor from behind using Aquaman's broken weapon. Barry knocks out the Advisor while Kent returns to destroy the bombers.

Before returning to his Earth, Allen shares his goodbyes with the JSA. Wonder Woman gives him the ring Trevor gave her, warning him of holding off for tomorrow. Allen and Garrick use their combined speed to send the former back to the moment he intercepted the Kryptonite bullet. After destroying Brainiac with it, Allen suggests forming a team, to Superman to combat future threats before returning to Iris and proposing to her, which she accepts.

Voice cast

Production
The film was officially announced in August 2020, during the Superman: Man of Tomorrow panel at DC FanDome. Some of the concepts for the story and setting originated from a Wonder Woman animated series developed by producer Butch Lukic, who would later incorporate them into the film.

Release
The film was released on digital platforms on April 27, 2021, and was released on Blu-ray and DVD on May 11.

Reception
On Rotten Tomatoes, the film has an approval rating of 81% based on 16 reviews, with an average rating of 7.10/10.

Jesse Schedeen of IGN rated the film a 9 out of 10: "Justice Society: World War II easily ranks among the best of long-running DC Universe Movies series. It draws just the right amount of inspiration from the source material while also pulling from adventure movies like Raiders of the Lost Ark to spin an entertaining superhero yarn. It deftly avoids the pacing issues that have plagued so many of these movies and manages to take full advantage of nearly every member of its ensemble cast. Clearly, Warner Bros. should be putting Barry Allen at the center of these animated films more often".

The film earned $732,012 from domestic DVD sales and $2,887,606 from domestic Blu-ray sales, bringing its total domestic home video earnings to $3,619,618.

Future

The Flash makes a non-speaking cameo in Batman: The Long Halloween: Part II's post-credits scene. Additionally, Criss and Bomer will reprise their roles as Clark Kent / Superman and Barry Allen / The Flash in the upcoming film Legion of Super-Heroes, which will also be set in the Tomorrowverse.

Notes

References

External links
 

2020s American animated films
2020s direct-to-video animated superhero films
2021 animated films
2021 direct-to-video films
2020s superhero films
2021 films
Tomorrowverse
Animated action films
Animated films about time travel
Animated war films
American adult animated films
DC Universe Animated Original Movies
2020s English-language films
Justice Society of America
American World War II films